Galina Shatnaya (born 28 March 1975) is a Kazakhstani synchronized swimmer. She competed in the women's duet at the 2000 Olympic Games.

References 

1975 births
Living people
Sportspeople from Almaty
Kazakhstani synchronized swimmers
Olympic synchronized swimmers of Kazakhstan
Synchronized swimmers at the 2000 Summer Olympics
Artistic swimmers at the 1998 Asian Games
Asian Games competitors for Kazakhstan